The Chilkat River is a river in British Columbia and southeastern Alaska that flows southward from the Coast Range to the Chilkat Inlet and ultimately Lynn Canal. It reaches the ocean at the abandoned area of Wells, Alaska and deposits into a long delta area.

The river was named by the Russians for the Chilkat group of Tlingit, called /t͡ʃiɬqut/ in their own language, who lived in the region. The name means "salmon storehouse".

Near the Chilkat River is the Alaska Chilkat Bald Eagle Preserve, where thousands of bald eagles appear between October and February, to take advantage of late salmon runs. Nearby Haines, the nearest town, is the most common organization spot for birdwatchers.

Tributaries
Klehini River
Tsirku River

See also
Chilkat Peninsula
List of rivers of Alaska
List of British Columbia rivers

References

Rivers of Haines Borough, Alaska
Rivers of Alaska
Rivers of the Boundary Ranges
Rivers of British Columbia
International rivers of North America
Tlingit